The Brazil Independence Cup was an international football tournament held in Brazil, from 11 June to 9 July 1972, to commemorate the 150th anniversary of the Brazilian Declaration of Independence. It was called the Minicopa by the Brazilians and the final was between Brazil and Portugal, in the Maracanã Stadium. Brazil won 1–0, with Jairzinho scoring in the 89th minute.

Brazil no longer had Pelé but still had Tostão, Jairzinho and Rivelino, the later two also played in the 1974 FIFA World Cup, in West Germany.

Despite Portugal's quality results and team, including Benfica players such as Eusébio, Jaime Graça, José Henrique, Humberto Coelho, Rui Jordão, and Toni, the team missed the World Cup 1974 and 1978 qualifying matches, so this tournament was their best result until the 1984 European Football Championship.

Format
Twenty teams competed; 18 national teams as well as two representative sides from Africa and CONCACAF (North and Central America and the Caribbean).

First round
15 teams competed in the first round, while 5 teams (Brazil, Czechoslovakia, Scotland, Soviet Union, Uruguay) received byes to the final stage.

The teams are drawn into three groups of 5 teams. Each team plays each other team in its group once, earning 2 points for a win and 1 for a draw. The three first-placed teams advance to the final stage.

Final stage
The 8 teams are drawn into two groups of 4 teams. Each team plays each other team in its group once, earning 2 points for a win and 1 for a draw.

The two group runners-up play each other in the third-place playoff.

The two group winners play each other in the final.

Venues

The tournament was played in 12 cities: Aracaju, Belo Horizonte, Campo Grande, Curitiba, Maceió, Manaus, Natal, Porto Alegre, Recife, Rio de Janeiro, Salvador and São Paulo.

Squads

Group stage

Group A

Group B

Group C

Final stage

Group A

Group B

Third place match

Final

Statistics

Goalscorers

Hat-tricks

References
 Macario Reyes: Brazil Independence Cup 1972, Rec.Sport.Soccer Statistics Foundation, 27 June 2007.
 Eliézer Sebastián Pérez Pérez: Brazil Independence Cup 1972 – Additional Details, RSSSF, 6 July 2007.

External links 
 Sala de troféus Confederação Brasileira de Futebol, 27 May 2011. (Information about the Taça Independência)
 Tournament: Taça Independência (Mini-Copa), EU-Football.info (details about matches with European participation)

 
1972
Independence Cup
June 1972 sports events in South America
July 1972 sports events in South America
International men's association football invitational tournaments